United States v. Khalid Sheikh Mohammed, et al. is the trial of five alleged Al-Qaeda members for aiding the September 11, 2001 attacks.  Charges were announced by Brigadier General Thomas W. Hartmann on February 11, 2008 at a press conference hosted by the Pentagon.  The men charged are Khalid Sheikh Mohammed, Walid bin Attash, Ramzi bin al-Shibh, Ammar al-Baluchi, and Mustafa Ahmad al Hawsawi.

Charges 
The five men are charged under the military commission system, as established by Congress under the Military Commissions Act of 2006. The charges, which were brought in 2011, are the following: attacking civilians, attacking civilian objects, intentionally causing serious bodily injury, murder in violation of the law of war, destruction of property in violation of the law of war, hijacking or hazarding a vessel or aircraft, terrorism, and providing material support for terrorism. If convicted, the men may face the death penalty. 

The murder charge involves 2,973 individual counts of murderone for each person killed in the 9/11 attacks.

The trial in a military commission

On February 11, 2008, at a Pentagon press briefing, original charges were announced by Brigadier General Thomas W. Hartmann, U.S. Air Force, against six accused. By the time charges were "referred" (the military procedural equivalent of an indictment) in May 2008, there were only five accused. Later, it was revealed that the military commission Convening Authority (Susan Crawford, at the time) who referred the charges had seen evidence that the additional detainee originally charged, Mohammed al-Qhatani, had been tortured in military custody. Ms. Crawford determined that, as a result, he could not be prosecuted.

The trial was first presided over by military judge Colonel Ralph Kohlmann, U.S. Marine Corps. The trial began in June 5, 2008, with the arraignment. Court personnel, prosecutors, defense attorneys, victims and family members of victims, as well as members of the press and non-governmental organizations, all traveled to Guantanamo Naval Station for the arraignment.

The U.S. Department of Defense has built a $12 million "Expeditionary Legal Complex" in Guantánamo with a courtroom designed to protect classified information, and capable of trying the alleged co-conspirators before one judge and jury. Only members of the defense teams of each of the five defendants, the prosecution team, court staff, and jury members may enter the courtroom itself. Media and other observers may watch unclassified proceedings only, sequestered in a room behind thick glass, located at the back of the large court facility. The sound from the courtroom to the spectator gallery is delayed 40 seconds, to allow the judge or court security officer to cut the sound feed, when necessary to protect classified information.

The death penalty against any of the men requires the unanimous agreement of the members of the commission to impose death on that specific accused. Members of a military commission must all be active duty U.S. military officers.

At the 2008 arraignment, Mohammed insisted he would not be represented by any attorneys. The other detainees quickly followed suit and said they too wanted to represent themselves, although the judge did not allow them to do so. One of the civilian attorneys Mohammed spurned, David Nevin, later told the Associated Press that he would attempt to meet with Mohammed to "hear him out and see if we can give him information that is helpful".

Mohammed was careful not to interrupt Kohlmann. He lost his composure only after the Marine colonel ordered several defense attorneys to keep quiet: Mohammed said in broken English, his voice rising "It's an inquisition. It's not a trial. After torturing they transfer us to inquisition-land in Guantanamo."

He explained that he believes only in the Sharia law and railed against U.S. President George W. Bush for waging a "crusade war". When the judge warned Mohammed that he will face execution if convicted of organizing the attacks on America, Mohammed said he welcomes the death penalty. "Yes, this is what I wish, to be a martyr for a long time", Mohammed declared. "I will, God willing, have this, by you."

A sound feed to journalists from the courtroom was turned off twice.

The sound was also turned off when another defendant discussed early days of his imprisonment. Judge Ralph Kohlmann said that in both cases sound was turned off because classified information was discussed.

On September 23, 2008, in the voir dire process, Mohammed questioned the judge on his potential bias at trial. "Glaring and poking an occasional finger in the air", Mohammed told Kohlmann, "the government considers all of us fanatical extremists", and asked, "How can you, as an officer of the U.S. Marine Corps, stand over me in judgment?" Insisting that he was attempting to work out if Kohlmann was a religious extremist, he continued: "[President] Bush said this is a crusader war and Osama bin Laden said this is a holy war against the crusades. If you were part of Jerry Falwell or Pat Robertson's group, then you would not be impartial."

For his part, Kohlmann attempted to maintain his dignity, explaining that he was currently unaffiliated with a church "because I've moved so often". He added that he had previously worshipped at "various Lutheran churches and Episcopal churches".

Mohammed then proceeded to ask Kohlmann about his views on torture. As part of the background materials supplied to himor made available to the civilian lawyers who are voluntarily assisting him in his defensehe referred to an ethics seminar that Kohlmann had conducted at his daughter's high school in 2005, in which the students had been asked to consider their responses to a "Ticking Time Bomb" scenario. Based on a fictional proposition that a bomb is about to go off, and an unwilling captive knows its location but is unwilling to disclose the information, the scenario is widely used by proponents of "enhanced interrogation techniques" to justify the use of torture.

Kohlmann explained that he encouraged the debate as part of "a complex question that might be dealt with differently if someone were specifically trying to save the nation or just looking at it from an ethical sense or just looking at it from a legal sense", and dismissed a combative question from Mohammed"It seems that you are supportive of the use of torture for national security?"by stating, "I have no idea where that would come from."

On October 12, 2008, Kohlmann ruled that Khalid Sheikh Mohammed, and his four co-charged, should be provided with laptops, so they can work on their defenses.

Kohlmann unexpectedly replaced
Kohlmann was scheduled to retire in 2009. In November 2008, he was unexpectedly replaced by Stephen Henley.

Possible guilty plea
On December 8, 2008, Khalid Sheikh Mohammed and his four co-defendants told the judge that they wished to confess and plead guilty to all charges.  The plea was to be delayed until mental competency hearings for Mustafa Ahmad al-Hawsawi and Ramzi bin al-Shibh could be held regarding which Mohammed said, "We want everyone to plead together." Spencer Ackerman, writing in the Washington Independent, reported that Presiding Officer Stephen Henley had to consider whether he was authorized to accept guilty pleas.

Transfer of the case to a civilian court
In July 2009 US Attorney General Eric Holder assigned eight experienced criminal prosecutors to build the best criminal case they could against Khalid Sheikh Mohammed and his co-conspirators. His prosecutors, Holder said, had "constructed a case that uses materials and evidence that does not derive from the techniques that were controversial", which would "maximize our chances for success". It was a major concern to Holder that the case not rest on torture. "It's a statement about what this Administration is about", he said. "It's a statement about this Attorney General. We are not going to use the products of interrogation techniques that this President has banned."

On 13 November 2009 Eric Holder announced that Khalid Sheikh Mohammed, Ramzi bin al-Shibh, Walid bin Attash, Ali Abdul Aziz Ali and Mustafa Ahmed al-Hawsawi will all be transferred to the U.S. District Court for the Southern District of New York for trial. He also expressed confidence that an impartial jury would be found "to ensure a fair trial in New York".

A rally near the federal court building in Foley Square, in lower Manhattan, was held on 5 December 2010 at which the decision to transfer the case to a civilian court was severely criticized. It was organized, in part, by Debra Burlingame, the sister of the pilot Charles Burlingame, who was killed when Al Qaeda hijackers crashed the plane he had been flying into the Pentagon. Burlingame is one of the three founders of Keep America Safe, a political-advocacy group. Andrew McCarthy, the former Chief Assistant U.S. Attorney who led the prosecution of the 1993 World Trade Center attack, spoke at this rally declaring that Eric Holder didn't "understand what rule of law has always been in wartime". He said, "It's military commissions. It's not to wrap our enemies in our Bill of Rights."

In a letter to president Barack Obama, Dianne Feinstein, the chair of the Senate Intelligence Committee, suggested that holding a trial in New York was dangerous. "New York City has been a high-priority target since at least the first World Trade Center bombing", she wrote. "The trial of the most significant terrorist in custody would add to the threat."

On 21 January 2010 all charges have been withdrawn in the military commissions against the five suspects in the September 11, 2001, terror attacks being held at Guantanamo Bay. The charges were dropped "without prejudice"a procedural move that allows federal officials to transfer the men to trial in a civilian court and also allows for the possibility, if necessary, of bringing charges again in military commissions.

In February 2010 White House spokesman Robert Gibbs on CNN said that he expects Mohammed to be found guilty and executed. "Khalid Sheikh Mohammed is going to meet justice and he's going to meet his maker. He will be brought to justice and he's likely to be executed for the heinous crimes he committed." The White House spokesperson's statement has been criticized as violating the principle of the presumption of innocence and has been characterized as egregious by an attorney of Guantanamo Bay detainees.

In February 2010 Fox News reported that the legal counsel of Khalid Sheikh Mohammed, and the legal counsel of several other captives, was halted without warning. The attorneys had made the trip to Guantanamo in the usual mannera trip that requires advising authorities of the purpose of their trip.  However, upon their arrival in Guantanamo, they were informed they were no longer allowed to see their clients.  They were told that letters to their clients, telling them that they had travelled to Cuba, to see them, could not be delivered, as they were no longer authorized to write to their clients.  Camp authorities told them that since the charges against their clients had been dropped, while the Department of Justice figured out where to charge them, they no longer needed legal counsel.  Camp authorities told them that, henceforward, all access to the captives had to be approved by Jay Johnson, the Department of Defense's General Counsel. Fox reported that during earlier periods when the charges had been dropped the captives had still been allowed to see their attorneys.  Fox claimed that questions they asked camp authorities lead to the captives' access to their attorneys being restored.

Transfer of the case back to a military commission
On 7 January 2011 US President Barack Obama signed the National Defense Authorization Act which explicitly prohibits the use of US Defense Department funds to transfer detainees from Guantanamo Bay to the United States or other countries. It also bars Pentagon funds from being used to build facilities in the United States to house detainees, as the president originally suggested. The move essentially barred the administration from trying detainees in civilian courts. The president objected to the provision in the bill before signing it, calling it "a dangerous and unprecedented challenge to critical executive branch authority" but also said his team would work with the US Congress to "seek repeal of these restrictions".

On 4 April 2011 Attorney General Eric Holder announced that Khalid Sheikh Mohammed and four other 9/11 terror suspects will face a military trial at the Guantanamo Bay detention facility. In announcing his decision, Holder criticized Congress for imposing restrictions on the Justice Department's ability to bring the men to New York for civilian trials. "After thoroughly studying the case, it became clear to me that the best venue for prosecution was in federal court. I stand by that decision today", Holder said. "As the president has said, those unwise and unwarranted restrictions (imposed by Congress) undermine our counterterrorism efforts and could harm our national security. Decisions about who, where and how to prosecute have always beenand must remainthe responsibility of the executive branch." Holder insisted, "We were prepared to bring a powerful case against Khalid Sheikh Mohammed and his four co-conspiratorsone of the most well-researched and documented cases I have ever seen in my decades of experience as a prosecutor." He added, "Had this case proceeded in Manhattan or in an alternative venue in the United States, as I seriously explored in the past year, I am confident that our justice system would have performed with the same distinction that has been its hallmark for over 200 years." Holder had promised to seek the death penalty for each of the five men and on 4 April he warned that it is an "open question" if such a penalty can be imposed by a military commission if the defendants plead guilty.

On 5 May 2012 the trial started. A small number of 9/11 victims' relatives were attending the hearing. Proceedings were delayed as one of the defendants, Waleed bin Attash, appeared in court while restrained in his chair. The restraints were later removed after defence counsel had given assurances that he would "behave". Khalid Sheikh Mohammed refused to answer the judge's questions. All the defendants refused to wear the earphones that provide translation into Arabic. Then an Arabic translator present in court ensured that the accused could follow proceedings.

The trial is conducted in a specially-built courtroom at Guantanamo.  Witnesses may see the proceedings through soundproof glass and hear an audio feed that is time-delayed 40 seconds.  When classified material is mentioned in the court, the Court can press a censorship button to cut the audio feed to the observers and "illuminate a red light on the judge's bench".    However, "it became entirely unclear who is in charge of pressing that button and by extension, who or what entity is really running this trial or monitoring the proceedings externally".

On October 17, 2012, Mohammed spoke briefly.

In response, Judge James Pohl seemed apologetic for allowing the speech:

On January 28, 2013, during a pretrial hearing, "the sound system in the courtroom was suddenly cut, to the surprise of even the judge", as if the "censorship button" was pressed, audio feed was cut and the red light was illuminated.  When the audio feed resumed, trial Judge Col. James L. Pohl said, "Note for the record that the 40-second delay was initiated, not by me. I'm curious as to why. If some external body is turning the commission off under their own view what ought to be with no reason or explanation, then we are going to have a little meeting about who turns that light on or off."

The Miami Herald reported that "The judge ... was clearly furious."

All four accused refused to enter a plea and Khalid Sheikh Mohammed refused to answer the judge's questions, which his lawyer said he was doing in protest at his alleged torture, and because he believed the tribunal was unfair.

In October 2014, Mr. Mohammed and four codefendants petitioned the Commission to ban female guards from touching them. Attorneys for Mr. Mohammad and his codefendants argued that their Muslim faith forbids any contact between them and woman other than their wives and immediate female relatives; therefore, physical contact with female guards limits the accused free exercise of religion and causes undue physical and mental harm. The Defense argued the use of female guards is in violation of statutory and constitutional protections under domestic law, as well as additional protections under international humanitarian law. Request for relief was explicitly sought under the Religious Freedom Restoration Act of 1993, which states that "the Government may not 'substantially burden' an individual's free exercise of religion except when the burden is in furtherance of a 'compelling governmental interest' and is the 'least restrictive means' of pursuing the compelling interest".

On January 7, 2015, presiding Judge Col. James L. Pohl granted a temporary order "limiting the use of female guards to physically touch" Mr. Mohammad and his codefendants, "during movements to and from attorney-client meetings and Commission hearings, absent exigent circumstances, until such time the Commission makes a final ruling".

On July 8, 2016, Judge Pohl rescinded the temporary order, citing that under the Religious Freedom Restoration Act, the United States government has legitimate interests in "gender-neutral staffing to promote detention facility security, full integration of women into the Armed Forces, and prevention of gender discrimination".

On August 10, 2012, the government filed a pleading describing an ex parte motion seeking permission of the military commission to destroy a military black site where the accused were imprisoned. In response, the defense filed dozens of discovery requests and motions to compel. On August 12, 2013, the military commission ruled that information related to the black site would be admissible as evidence in court, and protected under the law as such.

In June 2014, the military commission issued an ex parte order authorizing the substitution of documented evidence provided by the government, in lieu of preserving the black site for further investigation. The military commission also required that the defense team be notified of the impending destruction of evidence. However, the black site was destroyed in 2014, and the defense team was not notified until February 2016. In response, the prosecution stated this error was "simple miscommunication, resulting in inaction", between the military commission and government, each believing the task of notifying the defense team was that of the other.

On May 10, 2016, defense attorneys for Mr. Mohammad, filed a motion to recuse the military judge and current prosecution team, in response to the ex parte order leading to the "secret destruction of evidence with important guilt phase and mitigation value, despite a public order not to". On August 19, 2016, defense attorneys submitted a request "seeking all documents and information regarding the authorization for and destruction of the black site" including all actions taken by the government concerning the issue, communications between all parties involved, and documentation regarding any efforts taken by the government to notify the defense team about destruction of the black site. The motion was denied.

On September 28, 2016, the defense team filed a subject motion to compel discovery, or to dismiss all charges. On January 17, 2017, Judge Pohl granted this motion in part: the government is to provide the defense team with specified information from a limited number of classified documents pertaining to the decommission of the black site. All other requests for compelling discovery were denied, as was the request for dismissal of charges.

Trial date
On August 30, 2019, Judge W. Shane Cohen set the trial to begin on January 11, 2021. Finding that the case "will face a host of administrative and logistics challenges requiring coordination between [the prosecution, the defense], the Convening Authority, classified information equity holders, and installation management officials", the Commission also introduced a scheduling order for the trial.

On September 7, 2021, pre-trial hearings resumed after a break of a year and a half due to the COVID-19 pandemic and personnel changes.

On July 18, 2022, the U.S Department of Defense released a media invitation for the pre-trial hearing scheduled from September 17, 2022 to October 15, 2022. However, in August 2022 the pre-trials were postponed to an unspecified date. In December 2022, hearings were further postponed into 2023, with speculation that they may be delayed even more as the Biden administration weighs a possible plea deal that would take the death penalty off the table. This news attracted criticism from Republicans, with Jim Jordan tweeting, "Joe Biden’s allies are negotiating lesser sentences for 9/11 attackers. If they won’t punish terrorists, how can we trust them to lock up criminals in your neighborhood?”.

Resignation of Major Jason Wright
In 2011, Jason Wright was appointed to serve as Mohammed's military counsel. In April 2014 Wright went on record that he felt the United States Army was making him choose between his military career, and his responsibilities to his client.  Wright described how he had spent the previous three years building a rapport with Mohammed, and that the military would undermine his right to a fair trial by reassigning him.  Wright said he felt he had no choice but to resign his Army commission and continue to represent Mohammed as a civilian.

Wright had been arguing that he needed access to classified records of Mohammed's three years of interrogations in CIA custodyinterrogations the CIA has acknowledged included waterboarding and other forms of torture. Wright was promoted from Captain to Major in September 2012.  Army lawyers normally attend a year of graduate school, when they are promoted to Major.  While most officers take that year of schooling immediately, Wright followed the procedure to apply for a deferral of his training.  He received a one-year deferral, but when that expired he felt his responsibilities to Mohammed required him to resign, so he could continue to be his counsel, as a civilian.

Role of Gina Haspel
On January 8, 2019, Carol Rosenberg of the Miami Herald reported that partially redacted transcripts from a pre-trial hearing seemed to indicate that Gina Haspel had been the "Chief of Base" of a clandestine CIA detention site at the Guantanamo Bay Naval Station in the 2003–2004 period.

References

Wikipedia articles with style issues from June 2021
Proceedings surrounding the September 11 attacks
21st-century American trials